The Kokusai Ku-7 Manazuru (真鶴 "white-naped crane"; Allied code-name Buzzard) was a large experimental twin boom Japanese military glider.

Design and development
An enlarged version of the earlier Maeda Ku-1 glider, it was developed during 1942. The use of a twin boom design allowed for a large square cargo door, which meant that the aircraft was capable of carrying either 32 soldiers, 7600 kg of cargo or even a light tank. It required a powerful towing aircraft, either the Nakajima Ki-49 or the Mitsubishi Ki-67, which were in short supply. As a result, the aircraft were modified by fitting them with engines, which were designated the Ki-105 Otori (鳳 "Phoenix"). Intended for use as fuel transports, only nine, of 300 ordered, were produced before development priorities were shifted elsewhere.

Variants
Ku-7: Large experimental military transport glider.
Ku-7-II: Original designation for the Ki-105.
Kokusai Ki-105 Ohtori: Long-range fuel tanker aircraft, powered by 2x  Mitsubishi Ha26-II 14-cylinder radial engines; nine built. Maximum take-off weight:; normal payload:; cruising speed:; maximum range: .

Specifications (Ku-7)

See also

References

Ku-07
Ku-07, Kokusai
1940s military gliders
World War II Japanese transport aircraft
High-wing aircraft
Aircraft first flown in 1942
Twin-boom aircraft